Shadows of the North is a lost 1923 American silent adventure film directed by Robert F. Hill and written by Paul Schofield. The film stars William Desmond, Virginia Brown Faire, Fred Kohler, William Welsh, Al Hart, and James O. Barrows. The film was released by Universal Pictures on August 27, 1923.

Cast 
William Desmond as Ben 'Wolf' Darby
Virginia Brown Faire as Beatrice Neilson
Fred Kohler as Ray Brent
William Welsh as Jeffrey Neilson
Al Hart as Hemingway 
James O. Barrows as Ezra 'Pancake' Darby 
Rin Tin Tin as King, the dog

References

External links 

1923 films
1920s English-language films
Universal Pictures films
American silent feature films
American adventure films
1923 adventure films
Films directed by Robert F. Hill
American black-and-white films
Lost American films
Rin Tin Tin
1923 lost films
Lost adventure films
1920s American films
Silent adventure films